Youth Revival is the second live album from Hillsong Young & Free. Sparrow Records alongside Hillsong Music Australia released the album on 26 February 2016. On 2 November 2016, along with their campaign "An Act of Real Love", the official music video of "Real Love" was released. It received a nomination for Best Contemporary Christian Music Album at the 59th Annual Grammy Awards.

Critical reception

Matt Conner, allotting the album a three star rating from CCM Magazine, says, "Youth Revival is...a spirited live recording that captures the blips and bloops, pulses and praises of an impassioned worship gathering." Awarding the album five stars at Worship Leader, Jeremy Armstrong states, "This is a rare release that accomplishes exactly what it sets out to do: make a powerful impact with songs that clearly portray the truth of Christ in a musical and cultural language that resonates with the youth today." Mikayla Shriver, rating the album three and a half stars from New Release Today, writes, "Hillsong Young & Free's Youth Revival packages worship into modern, youth-friendly music, matching the popular style of today's music in its own unique way." Giving the album three and a half stars for Today's Christian Entertainment, Laura Chambers describes, "Youth Revival finally brings a Biblical perspective to the pop culture table, cleverly combining the style of the day with a relevant message of love and gratitude, the latter something that is sorely lacking in our relentless push to have the next thing." Chris Major, allocating the album five stars by The Christian Beat, says, "Youth Revival is a must listen for any fan of contemporary Christian music. Its ambition, its thankful atmosphere, and its joy are unmatched. The melodies and sounds are masterful and beautifully complement the massive wave of ecstatic praise. The unbounded and unrelenting energy surging through every track makes the urge to celebrate along difficult to resist." Indicating in a four and a half star review at CM Addict, Michael Tackett writes, "With this sophomore release, Hillsong Young & Free is an example of modern Christian music done right."

Track listing

Youth Revival Acoustic 

On 24 February 2017, an acoustic recording of the Youth Revival album was released via Hillsong Music Australia.

Track listing

Charts

Weekly charts

Year-end charts

References

2016 live albums
Hillsong Young & Free albums
Sparrow Records albums